The Saint Michael's Purple Knights are the athletic teams that represent Saint Michael's College, located in Colchester, Vermont, in NCAA Division II intercollegiate sports.

The Purple Knights compete as members of the Northeast-10 Conference for most sports. Three teams compete as de facto Division I members. In skiing, a coeducational sport with a single NCAA team championship for all three divisions, the coed teams are part of the Eastern Intercollegiate Ski Association. In women's ice hockey, which has a combined Division I/II national championship, the Purple Knights are a member of the New England Women's Hockey Alliance.

Varsity teams

Men's sports (9)
Baseball
Basketball
Cross country
Golf
Ice hockey
Lacrosse
Soccer
Swimming and diving
Tennis

Women's sports (10)
Basketball
Cross country
Field hockey
Ice hockey
Lacrosse
Soccer
Softball
Swimming and diving
Tennis
Volleyball

Co-ed sports (1)
Skiing

Notable alumni

 Travis Warech (attended; born 1991), basketball player for Hapoel Be'er Sheva of the Israeli Premier League

References

External links